Brian Gallagher (born 8 September 1958 in Glasgow) is a Scottish former football player. Gallacher played for Dumbarton, St Mirren, Kilmarnock, Partick Thistle, Albion Rovers and Inverness Caledonian.

His father Tommy, grandfather Patsy, uncle Willie and cousin Kevin were also footballers, and they related to another footballing branch of the family, John Divers and his son of the same name who both played for Celtic.

Honours
Stirlingshire Cup: 1980–81
Renfrewshire Cup: 1982–83, 1983–84

References 

1958 births
Living people
Footballers from Glasgow
Scottish footballers
Dumbarton F.C. players
Kilmarnock F.C. players
St Mirren F.C. players
Partick Thistle F.C. players
Albion Rovers F.C. players
Caledonian F.C. players
Scottish Football League players
Association football midfielders
Brian